Tomáš Hambálek (born 21 June 2001) is a Slovak footballer who plays for MFK Skalica as an attacking midfielder.

Club career

FC Nitra
Hambálek made his Fortuna Liga debut for Nitra in a home fixture against Senica on 20 June 2020. He came on after 82 minutes of play to replace Samuel Šefčík, who scored the match's first goal in the 59th minute. Nitra won the match 2-0.

References

External links
 FC Nitra official club profile 
 Futbalnet profile 
 
 

2001 births
Living people
Sportspeople from Nitra
Slovak footballers
Association football midfielders
FC Nitra players
FC Spartak Trnava players
FC Petržalka players
MFK Skalica players
Slovak Super Liga players